The Alexander Clark House is an historic house located in Muscatine, Iowa, United States. The house is associated with Alexander Clark (1826–1891), an African American civil rights pioneer and US Minister to Liberia. Clark was a 19th-century abolitionist who made his home in Muscatine for most of his adult life. He fought and won for the integration of public schools in Iowa when his daughter was forbidden to attend her neighborhood school. The case went to the Iowa Supreme Court, which resulted in the integration of all schools in the state. He was an associate of Frederick Douglass, helped to establish Iowa's only Colored regiment during the American Civil War, and the African Methodist Episcopal Church in Muscatine. Clark was named the Minister to Liberia in 1890 by President Benjamin Harrison, where he died a year later. The house was built in 1879 after a fire destroyed Clark's previous house. It was moved  from its original location in 1975, The house was individually listed on the National Register of Historic Places in 1976. It was included as a contributing property in the West Hill Historic District in 2008.

References

Houses completed in 1879
Italianate architecture in Iowa
Houses in Muscatine County, Iowa
National Register of Historic Places in Muscatine County, Iowa
Houses on the National Register of Historic Places in Iowa
African-American history of Iowa
Buildings and structures in Muscatine, Iowa
Individually listed contributing properties to historic districts on the National Register in Iowa